Winterswijk is a railway station in Winterswijk, Netherlands. The station opened on 24 June 1878 and is located on the Zutphen–Winterswijk railway and the Winterswijk–Zevenaar railway. The train services are operated by Arriva.

The station used to be an important point where freight trains would go into Germany. There used to be lines going in 5 directions: Arnhem, Zutphen, Bocholt (Germany), Borken (Germany) and Neede. Today there are 3 buses to Germany, otherwise passengers have to travel to Arnhem, Hengelo or Enschede.

Train services

Bus services

Gallery

References

External links

NS website 
Dutch Public Transport journey planner 
Arriva Gelderland website 
Arriva Achterhoek Network Map 

Railway stations in Gelderland
Railway stations opened in 1878
Winterswijk